USS Commencement Bay (CVE-105) (ex-St. Joseph Bay), the lead ship of her class, was an escort carrier and later helicopter carrier of the United States Navy, used mostly as a training ship.

Construction and service 
Commencement Bay was launched 9 May 1944 by Todd Pacific Shipyards, Tacoma, Washington; sponsored by Mrs. F. Eves; and commissioned 27 November 1944, Captain Roscoe Leroy Bowman in command.

Commencement Bay reported at Seattle 1 February 1945 for duty as a training ship in Puget Sound until 2 October. During this time she trained 545 officers and 5,053 men of precommissioning crews for sister escort carriers, and qualified 249 pilots of eight air groups in carrier takeoffs and landings. She sailed from Bremerton 21 October 1945, and arrived at Pearl Harbor 4 November for training and to conduct carrier qualifications until sailing 27 November for Seattle and Tacoma.

After visits to Los Angeles and San Pedro, she returned to Tacoma 28 January, where she was placed out of commission in reserve 30 November 1946. She was re-classified CVHE-105, 12 June 1955; and AKV-37, 7 May 1959. Commencement Bay was struck from the Navy List on 1 April 1971 before being sold for scrap on 25 August 1972.

References

Citation

Bibliography 

 

Commencement Bay-class escort carriers
World War II escort aircraft carriers of the United States
Training ships of the United States Navy
Ships built in Seattle
1944 ships